is a female beach volleyball player from Japan, who won the silver medal in the women's team competition at the 2006 Asian Games in Doha, partnering compatriot Eiko Koizumi. In the final the couple lost (1-2) to the Chinese pair Xue Chen and Zhang Xi. Tanaka started her sports career in indoor volleyball, and played for the Women's National Team.

Playing partners
Eiko Koizumi
Miho Makabe
Sanae Tsubakimoto
Miwa Asao
Mika Teru Saiki

References
 Profile

1975 births
Living people
Japanese beach volleyball players
Japanese women's volleyball players
Sportspeople from Saitama (city)
Asian Games medalists in beach volleyball
Volleyball players at the 2002 Asian Games
Beach volleyball players at the 2006 Asian Games
Beach volleyball players at the 2010 Asian Games
Women's beach volleyball players
Asian Games silver medalists for Japan
Asian Games bronze medalists for Japan
Medalists at the 2002 Asian Games
Medalists at the 2006 Asian Games